Arthur Wellesley, 1st Duke of Wellington,  (1 May 1769 – 14 September 1852) was an Anglo-Irish soldier and Tory statesman who was one of the leading military and political figures of 19th-century Britain, serving twice as prime minister of the United Kingdom. He is among the commanders who won and ended the Napoleonic Wars when the Seventh Coalition defeated Napoleon at the Battle of Waterloo in 1815.

Wellesley was born in Dublin into the Protestant Ascendancy in Ireland. He was commissioned as an ensign in the British Army in 1787, serving in Ireland as aide-de-camp to two successive lords lieutenant of Ireland. He was also elected as a member of Parliament in the Irish House of Commons. He was a colonel by 1796 and saw action in the Netherlands and in India, where he fought in the Fourth Anglo-Mysore War at the Battle of Seringapatam. He was appointed governor of Seringapatam and Mysore in 1799 and, as a newly appointed major-general, won a decisive victory over the Maratha Confederacy at the Battle of Assaye in 1803.

Wellesley rose to prominence as a general during the Peninsular campaign of the Napoleonic Wars, and was promoted to the rank of field marshal after leading the allied forces to victory against the French Empire at the Battle of Vitoria in 1813. Following Napoleon's exile in 1814, he served as the ambassador to France and was granted a dukedom. During the Hundred Days in 1815, he commanded the allied army which, together with a Prussian Army under Field Marshal Gebhard von Blücher, defeated Napoleon at Waterloo. Wellington's battle record is exemplary; he ultimately participated in some 60 battles during the course of his military career.

Wellington is famous for his adaptive defensive style of warfare, resulting in several victories against numerically superior forces while minimising his own losses. He is regarded as one of the greatest defensive commanders of all time, and many of his tactics and battle plans are still studied in military academies around the world. After the end of his active military career, he returned to politics. He was twice British prime minister as a member of the Tory party from 1828 to 1830 and for a little less than a month in 1834. He oversaw the passage of the Roman Catholic Relief Act 1829, but opposed the Reform Act 1832. He continued as one of the leading figures in the House of Lords until his retirement and remained Commander-in-Chief of the British Army until his death.

Early life

Family 
Wellesley was born into an aristocratic Anglo-Irish family, belonging to the Protestant Ascendancy, in Ireland as The Hon. Arthur Wesley. Wellesley was born the son of Anne Wellesley, Countess of Mornington and Garret Wesley, 1st Earl of Mornington. His father, Garret Wesley, was the son of Richard Wesley, 1st Baron Mornington and had a short career in politics representing the constituency Trim in the Irish House of Commons before succeeding his father as 2nd Baron Mornington in 1758. Garret Wesley was also an accomplished composer and in recognition of his musical and philanthropic achievements was elevated to the rank of Earl of Mornington in 1760. Wellesley's mother was the eldest daughter of Arthur Hill-Trevor, 1st Viscount Dungannon, after whom Wellesley was named.

Wellesley was the sixth of nine children born to the Earl and Countess of Mornington. His siblings included Richard, Viscount Wellesley (1760–1842); later 1st Marquess Wellesley, 2nd Earl of Mornington, Baron Maryborough.

Birth date and place 
The exact date and location of Wellesley's birth is not known; however, biographers mostly follow the same contemporary newspaper evidence which states that he was born on 1 May 1769,  the day before he was baptised in St Peters Church, Dublin. However,  states "registry of St. Peter's Church, Dublin, shows that he was christened there on 30 April 1769". His baptismal font was donated to St. Nahi's Church in Dundrum, Dublin, in 1914. As to the place of Wellesley's birth, he was most likely born at his parents' townhouse, 24 Upper Merrion Street, Dublin, now the Merrion Hotel. This contrasts with reports that his mother Anne, Countess of Mornington, recalled in 1815 that he had been born at 6 Merrion Street, Dublin. Other places have been put forward as the location of his birth, including Mornington House (the house next door on Upper Merrion), as his father had asserted and the Dublin packet boat.

Childhood 

In 1781, Arthur's father died and his eldest brother Richard inherited his father's earldom.

He went to the diocesan school in Trim when at Dangan, Mr Whyte's Academy when in Dublin, and Brown's School in Chelsea when in London. He then enrolled at Eton College, where he studied from 1781 to 1784. His loneliness there caused him to hate it, and makes it highly unlikely that he actually said "The Battle of Waterloo was won on the playing fields of Eton", a quotation which is often attributed to him. Moreover, Eton had no playing fields at the time. In 1785, a lack of success at Eton, combined with a shortage of family funds due to his father's death, forced the young Wellesley and his mother to move to Brussels. Until his early twenties, Arthur showed little sign of distinction and his mother grew increasingly concerned at his idleness, stating, "I don't know what I shall do with my awkward son Arthur."

In 1786, Arthur enrolled in the French Royal Academy of Equitation in Angers, where he progressed significantly, becoming a good horseman and learning French, which later proved very useful. Upon returning to England later the same year, he astonished his mother with his improvement.

Early military career

United Kingdom

Despite his new promise, Wellesley had yet to find a job and his family was still short of money, so upon the advice of his mother, his brother Richard asked his friend the Duke of Rutland (then Lord Lieutenant of Ireland) to consider Arthur for a commission in the Army. Soon afterward, on 7 March 1787, he was gazetted ensign in the 73rd Regiment of Foot. In October, with the assistance of his brother, he was assigned as aide-de-camp, on ten shillings a day (twice his pay as an ensign), to the new Lord Lieutenant of Ireland, Lord Buckingham. He was also transferred to the new 76th Regiment forming in Ireland and on Christmas Day, 1787, was promoted lieutenant. During his time in Dublin his duties were mainly social; attending balls, entertaining guests and providing advice to Buckingham. While in Ireland, he overextended himself in borrowing due to his occasional gambling, but in his defence stated that "I have often known what it was to be in want of money, but I have never got helplessly into debt".

On 23 January 1788, he transferred into the 41st Regiment of Foot, then again on 25 June 1789 he transferred to the 12th (Prince of Wales's) Regiment of (Light) Dragoons and, according to military historian Richard Holmes, he also reluctantly entered politics. Shortly before the general election of 1789, he went to the rotten borough of Trim to speak against the granting of the title "Freeman" of Dublin to the parliamentary leader of the Irish Patriot Party, Henry Grattan. Succeeding, he was later nominated and duly elected as a Member of Parliament (MP) for Trim in the Irish House of Commons. Because of the limited suffrage at the time, he sat in a parliament where at least two-thirds of the members owed their election to the landowners of fewer than a hundred boroughs. Wellesley continued to serve at Dublin Castle, voting with the government in the Irish parliament over the next two years. He became a captain on 30 January 1791, and was transferred to the 58th Regiment of Foot.

On 31 October, he transferred to the 18th Light Dragoons and it was during this period that he grew increasingly attracted to Kitty Pakenham, the daughter of Edward Pakenham, 2nd Baron Longford. She was described as being full of 'gaiety and charm'. In 1793, he proposed, but was turned down by her brother Thomas, Earl of Longford, who considered Wellesley to be a young man, in debt, with very poor prospects. An aspiring amateur musician, Wellesley, devastated by the rejection, burnt his violins in anger, and resolved to pursue a military career in earnest. He became a major by purchase in the 33rd Regiment in 1793. A few months later, in September, his brother lent him more money and with it he purchased a lieutenant-colonelcy in the 33rd.

Netherlands

In 1793, the Duke of York was sent to Flanders in command of the British contingent of an allied force destined for the invasion of France. In June 1794, Wellesley with the 33rd regiment set sail from Cork bound for Ostend as part of an expedition bringing reinforcements for the army in Flanders. They arrived too late to participate, and joined the Duke of York as he was pulling back towards the Netherlands. On 15 September 1794, at the Battle of Boxtel, east of Breda, Wellington, in temporary command of his brigade, had his first experience of battle. During General Abercromby's withdrawal in the face of superior French forces, the 33rd held off enemy cavalry, allowing neighbouring units to retreat safely. During the extremely harsh winter that followed, Wellesley and his regiment formed part of an allied force holding the defence line along the Waal River. The 33rd, along with the rest of the army, suffered heavy losses from attrition and illness. Wellesley's health was also affected by the damp environment. Though the campaign was to end disastrously, with the British army driven out of the United Provinces into the German states, Wellesley became more aware of battle tactics, including the use of lines of infantry against advancing columns, and the merits of supporting sea-power. He understood that the failure of the campaign was due in part to the faults of the leaders and the poor organisation at headquarters. He remarked later of his time in the Netherlands that "At least I learned what not to do, and that is always a valuable lesson".
Returning to England in March 1795, he was reinstated as a member of parliament for Trim for a second time. He hoped to be given the position of secretary of war in the new Irish government but the new lord-lieutenant, Lord Camden, was only able to offer him the post of Surveyor-General of the Ordnance. Declining the post, he returned to his regiment, now at Southampton preparing to set sail for the West Indies. After seven weeks at sea, a storm forced the fleet back to Poole.The 33rd was given time to recuperate and a few months later, Whitehall decided to send the regiment to India. Wellesley was promoted full colonel by seniority on 3 May 1796 and a few weeks later set sail for Calcutta with his regiment.

India
Arriving in Calcutta in February 1797 he spent 5 months there, before being sent in August to a brief expedition to the Philippines, where he established a list of new hygiene precautions for his men to deal with the unfamiliar climate. Returning in November to India, he learnt that his elder brother Richard, now known as Lord Mornington, had been appointed as the new Governor-General of India.

In 1798, he changed the spelling of his surname to "Wellesley"; up to this time he was still known as Wesley, which his eldest brother considered the ancient and proper spelling.

Fourth Anglo-Mysore War

As part of the campaign to extend the rule of the British East India Company, the Fourth Anglo-Mysore War broke out in 1798 against the Sultan of Mysore, Tipu Sultan. Arthur's brother Richard ordered that an armed force be sent to capture Seringapatam and defeat Tipu. During the war, rockets were used on several occasions. Wellesley was almost defeated by Tipu's Diwan, Purnaiah, at the Battle of Sultanpet Tope. Quoting Forrest,
At this point (near the village of Sultanpet, Figure 5) there was a large tope, or grove, which gave shelter to Tipu's rocketmen and had obviously to be cleaned out before the siege could be pressed closer to Srirangapattana island. The commander chosen for this operation was Col. Wellesley, but advancing towards the tope after dark on the 5th April 1799, he was set upon with rockets and musket-fires, lost his way and, as Beatson politely puts it, had to "postpone the attack" until a more favourable opportunity should offer.

The following day, Wellesley launched a fresh attack with a larger force, and took the whole position without any killed in action. On 22 April 1799, twelve days before the main battle, rocketeers maneuvered to the rear of the British encampment, then 'threw a great number of rockets at the same instant' to signal the beginning of an assault by 6,000 Indian infantry and a corps of Frenchmen, all ordered by Mir Golam Hussain and Mohomed Hulleen Mir Miran. The rockets had a range of about 1,000 yards. Some burst in the air like shells. Others, called ground rockets, would rise again on striking the ground and bound along in a serpentine motion until their force was spent. According to one British observer, a young English officer named Bayly: "So pestered were we with the rocket boys that there was no moving without danger from the destructive missiles ...". He continued:
The rockets and musketry from 20,000 of the enemy were incessant. No hail could be thicker. Every illumination of blue lights was accompanied by a shower of rockets, some of which entered the head of the column, passing through to the rear, causing death, wounds, and dreadful lacerations from the long bamboos of twenty or thirty feet, which are invariably attached to them.
Under the command of General Harris, some 24,000 troops were dispatched to Madras (to join an equal force being sent from Bombay in the west). Arthur and the 33rd sailed to join them in August.

After extensive and careful logistic preparation (which would become one of Wellesley's main attributes) the 33rd left with the main force in December and travelled across  of jungle from Madras to Mysore. On account of his brother, during the journey, Wellesley was given an additional command, that of chief advisor to the Nizam of Hyderabad's army (sent to accompany the British force). This position was to cause friction among many of the senior officers (some of whom were senior to Wellesley). During the battle, Wellesley led his men, in a line of battle of two ranks, against the enemy to a gentle ridge and gave the order to fire. After an extensive repetition of volleys, followed by a bayonet charge, the 33rd, in conjunction with the rest of Harris's force, forced Tipu's infantry to retreat.

Seringapatam
Immediately after their arrival at Seringapatam on 5 April 1799, the Battle of Seringapatam began and Wellesley was ordered to lead a night attack on the village of Sultanpettah, adjacent to the fortress to clear the way for the artillery. Because of a variety of factors including the Mysorean army's strong defensive preparations and the darkness the attack failed with 25 casualties due to confusion among the British. Wellesley suffered a minor injury to his knee from a spent musket-ball.  Although they would re-attack successfully the next day, after time to scout ahead the enemy's positions, the affair affected Wellesley. He resolved "never to attack an enemy who is preparing and strongly posted, and whose posts have not been reconnoitred by daylight".
Lewin Bentham Bowring gives this alternative account:

One of these groves, called the Sultanpet Tope, was intersected by deep ditches, watered from a channel running in an easterly direction about a mile from the fort. General Baird was directed to scour this grove and dislodge the enemy, but on his advancing with this object on the night of the 5th, he found the tope unoccupied. The next day, however, the Mysore troops again took possession of the ground, and as it was absolutely necessary to expel them, two columns were detached at sunset for the purpose. The first of these, under Colonel Shawe, got possession of a ruined village, which it successfully held. The second column, under Colonel Wellesley, on advancing into the tope, was at once attacked in the darkness of night by a tremendous fire of musketry and rockets. The men, floundering about amidst the trees and the water-courses, at last broke, and fell back in disorder, some being killed and a few taken prisoners. In the confusion Colonel Wellesley was himself struck on the knee by a spent ball, and narrowly escaped falling into the hands of the enemy.

A few weeks later, after extensive artillery bombardment, a breach was opened in the main walls of the fortress of Seringapatam. An attack led by Major-General Baird secured the fortress. Wellesley secured the rear of the advance, posting guards at the breach and then stationed his regiment at the main palace. After hearing news of the death of the Tipu Sultan, Wellesley was the first at the scene to confirm his death, checking his pulse. Over the coming day, Wellesley grew increasingly concerned over the lack of discipline among his men, who drank and pillaged the fortress and city. To restore order, several soldiers were flogged and four hanged.

After battle and the resulting end of the war, the main force under General Harris left Seringapatam and Wellesley, aged 30, stayed behind to command the area as the new Governor of Seringapatam and Mysore. While in India, Wellesley was ill for a considerable time, first with severe diarrhoea from the water and then with fever, followed by a serious skin infection caused by trichophyton.

Wellesley was in charge of raising an Anglo-Indian expeditionary force in Trincomali in early 1801 for the capture of Batavia and Mauritius from the French. However, on the eve of its departure, orders arrived from England that it was to be sent to Egypt to co-operate with Sir Ralph Abercromby in the expulsion of the French from Egypt. Wellesley had been appointed second in command to Baird, but owing to ill health did not accompany the expedition on 9 April 1801. This was fortunate for Wellesley, since the very vessel on which he was to have sailed sank in the Red Sea.

He was promoted to brigadier-general on 17 July 1801. He took residence within the Sultan's summer palace and reformed the tax and justice systems in his province to maintain order and prevent bribery. He also defeated the rebel warlord Dhoondiah Waugh in the Battle of Conaghull, after the latter had escaped from prison in Seringapatam during the battle there.

Dhoondiah Waugh insurgency
In 1800, whilst serving as Governor of Mysore, Wellesley was tasked with putting down an insurgency led by Dhoondiah Waugh, formerly a Patan trooper for Tipu Sultan. After the fall of Seringapatam he became a powerful brigand, raiding villages along the Maratha–Mysore border region. Despite initial setbacks, the East India Company having pursued and destroyed his forces once already, forcing him into retreat in August 1799, he raised a sizeable force composed of disbanded Mysore soldiers, captured small outposts and forts in Mysore, and was receiving the support of several Maratha killedars opposed to British occupation. This drew the attention of the British administration, who were beginning to recognise him as more than just a bandit, as his raids, expansion and threats to destabilise British authority suddenly increased in 1800.  The death of Tipu Sultan had created a power vacuum and Waugh was seeking to fill it.

Given independent command of a combined East India Company and British Army force,  Wellesley ventured north to confront Waugh in June 1800, with an army of 8,000 infantry and cavalry, having learnt that Waugh's forces numbered over 50,000, although the majority (around 30,000) were irregular light cavalry and unlikely to pose a serious threat to British infantry and artillery.

Throughout June–August 1800, Wellesley advanced through Waugh's territory, his troops escalading forts in turn and capturing each one with "trifling loss". The forts generally offered little resistance due to their poor construction and design. Wellesley did not have sufficient troops to garrison each fort and had to clear the surrounding area of insurgents before advancing to the next fort. On 31 July, he had "taken and destroyed Dhoondiah's baggage and six guns, and driven into the Malpoorba (where they were drowned) about five thousand people". Dhoondiah continued to retreat, but his forces were rapidly deserting, he had no infantry and due to the monsoon weather flooding river crossings he could no longer outpace the British advance. On 10 September, at the Battle of Conaghul, Wellesley personally led a charge of 1,400 British dragoons and Indian cavalry, in single line with no reserve, against Dhoondiah and his remaining 5,000 cavalry. Dhoondiah was killed during the clash, his body was discovered and taken to the British camp tied to a cannon. With this victory, Wellesley's campaign was concluded, and British authority had been restored.

Wellesley, with command of four regiments, had defeated Dhoondiah's larger rebel force, along with Dhoondiah himself, who was killed in the final battle. Wellesley then paid for the future upkeep of Dhoondiah's orphaned son.

Second Anglo-Maratha War

In September 1802, Wellesley learnt that he had been promoted to the rank of major-general. He had been gazetted on 29 April 1802, but the news took several months to reach him by sea. He remained at Mysore until November when he was sent to command an army in the Second Anglo-Maratha War.

When he determined that a long defensive war would ruin his army, Wellesley decided to act boldly to defeat the numerically larger force of the Maratha Empire. With the logistic assembly of his army complete (24,000 men in total) he gave the order to break camp and attack the nearest Maratha fort on 8 August 1803. The fort surrendered on 12 August after an infantry attack had exploited an artillery-made breach in the wall. With the fort now in British control Wellesley was able to extend control southwards to the river Godavari.

Assaye, Argaum and Gawilghur 

Splitting his army into two forces, to pursue and locate the main Marathas army, (the second force, commanded by Colonel Stevenson was far smaller) Wellesley was preparing to rejoin his forces on 24 September. His intelligence, however, reported the location of the Marathas' main army, between two rivers near Assaye. If he waited for the arrival of his second force, the Marathas would be able to mount a retreat, so Wellesley decided to launch an attack immediately.

On 23 September, Wellesley led his forces over a ford in the river Kaitna and the Battle of Assaye commenced. After crossing the ford the infantry was reorganised into several lines and advanced against the Maratha infantry. Wellesley ordered his cavalry to exploit the flank of the Maratha army just near the village. During the battle Wellesley himself came under fire; two of his horses were shot from under him and he had to mount a third. At a crucial moment, Wellesley regrouped his forces and ordered Colonel Maxwell (later killed in the attack) to attack the eastern end of the Maratha position while Wellesley himself directed a renewed infantry attack against the centre.

An officer in the attack wrote of the importance of Wellesley's personal leadership: "The General was in the thick of the action the whole time ... I never saw a man so cool and collected as he was ... though I can assure you, 'til our troops got the order to advance the fate of the day seemed doubtful ..." With some 6,000 Marathas killed or wounded, the enemy was routed, though Wellesley's force was in no condition to pursue. British casualties were heavy: the British losses amounted to 428 killed, 1,138 wounded and 18 missing (the British casualty figures were taken from Wellesley's own despatch). Wellesley was troubled by the loss of men and remarked that he hoped "I should not like to see again such loss as I sustained on 23 September, even if attended by such gain". Years later, however, he remarked that Assaye, and not Waterloo, was the best battle he ever fought.

Despite the damage done to the Maratha army, the battle did not end the war. A few months later in November, Wellesley attacked a larger force near Argaum, leading his army to victory again, with an astonishing 5,000 enemy dead at the cost of only 361 British casualties. A further successful attack at the fortress at Gawilghur, combined with the victory of General Lake at Delhi forced the Maratha to sign a peace settlement at Anjangaon (not concluded until a year later) called the Treaty of Surji-Anjangaon.

Military historian Richard Holmes remarked that Wellesley's experiences in India had an important influence on his personality and military tactics, teaching him much about military matters that would prove vital to his success in the Peninsular War. These included a strong sense of discipline through drill and order, the use of diplomacy to gain allies, and the vital necessity of a secure supply line. He also established high regard for the acquisition of intelligence through scouts and spies. His personal tastes also developed, including dressing himself in white trousers, a dark tunic, with Hessian boots and black cocked hat (that later became synonymous as his style).

Leaving India

Wellesley had grown tired of his time in India, remarking "I have served as long in India as any man ought who can serve anywhere else". In June 1804 he applied for permission to return home and as a reward for his service in India he was made a Knight of the Bath in September. While in India, Wellesley had amassed a fortune of £42,000 (considerable at the time), consisting mainly of prize money from his campaign. When his brother's term as Governor-General of India ended in March 1805, the brothers returned together to England on HMS Howe. Wellesley, coincidentally, stopped on his voyage at the island of Saint Helena and stayed in the same building in which Napoleon I would live during his later exile.

Return to Britain

Meeting Nelson 
In September 1805, Major-General Wellesley was newly returned from his campaigns in India and was not yet particularly well known to the public. He reported to the office of the Secretary of State for War and the Colonies to request a new assignment. In the waiting room, he met Vice-Admiral Horatio Nelson, already a known figure after his victories at the Nile and Copenhagen, who was briefly in England after months pursuing the French Toulon fleet to the West Indies and back. Some 30 years later, Wellington recalled a conversation that Nelson began with him which Wellesley found "almost all on his side in a style so vain and silly as to surprise and almost disgust me". Nelson left the room to inquire who the young general was and, on his return, switched to a very different tone, discussing the war, the state of the colonies, and the geopolitical situation as between equals. On this second discussion, Wellington recalled, "I don't know that I ever had a conversation that interested me more". This was the only time that the two men met; Nelson was killed at his victory at Trafalgar seven weeks later.

Wellesley then served in the abortive Anglo-Russian expedition to north Germany in 1805, taking a brigade to Elbe.

He then took a period of extended leave from the army and was elected as a Tory member of the British parliament for Rye in January 1806. A year later, he was elected MP for Newport on the Isle of Wight, and was then appointed to serve as Chief Secretary for Ireland under the Duke of Richmond. At the same time, he was made a privy counsellor. While in Ireland, he gave a verbal promise that the remaining Penal Laws would be enforced with great moderation, perhaps an indication of his later willingness to support Catholic emancipation.

War against Denmark-Norway 

Wellesley was in Ireland in May 1807 when he heard of the British expedition to Denmark-Norway. He decided to go, while maintaining his political appointments, and was appointed to command an infantry brigade in the Second Battle of Copenhagen, which took place in August. He fought at Køge, during which the men under his command took 1,500 prisoners, with Wellesley later present during the surrender.

By 30 September, he had returned to England and was raised to the rank of lieutenant general on 25 April 1808. In June 1808 he accepted the command of an expedition of 9,000 men. Preparing to sail for an attack on the Spanish colonies in South America (to assist the Latin American patriot Francisco de Miranda) his force was instead ordered to sail for Portugal, to take part in the Peninsular Campaign and rendezvous with 5,000 troops from Gibraltar.

Peninsular War

1808–1809 
Ready for battle, Wellesley left Cork on 12 July 1808 to participate in the war against French forces in the Iberian Peninsula, with his skills as a commander tested and developed.According to the historian Robin Neillands:

Wellesley defeated the French at the Battle of Roliça and the Battle of Vimeiro in 1808 but was superseded in command immediately after the latter battle. General Dalrymple then signed the controversial Convention of Sintra, which stipulated that the Royal Navy transport the French army out of Lisbon with all their loot, and insisted on the association of the only available government minister, Wellesley.
Dalrymple and Wellesley were recalled to Britain to face a Court of Enquiry. Wellesley had agreed to sign the preliminary armistice, but had not signed the convention, and was cleared.

Simultaneously, Napoleon entered Spain with his veteran troops to put down the revolt; the new commander of the British forces in the Peninsula, Sir John Moore, died during the Battle of Corunna in January 1809.

Although overall the land war with France was not going well from a British perspective, the Peninsula was the one theatre where they, with the Portuguese, had provided strong resistance against France and her allies. This contrasted with the disastrous Walcheren expedition, which was typical of the mismanaged British operations of the time. Wellesley submitted a memorandum to Lord Castlereagh on the defence of Portugal. He stressed its mountainous frontiers and advocated Lisbon as the main base because the Royal Navy could help to defend it. Castlereagh and the cabinet approved the memo and appointed him head of all British forces in Portugal.

Wellesley arrived in Lisbon on 22 April 1809 on board HMS Surveillante,after narrowly escaping shipwreck. Reinforced, he took to the offensive. In the Second Battle of Porto he crossed the Douro river in a daylight coup de main, and routed Marshal Soult's French troops in Porto.

With Portugal secured, Wellesley advanced into Spain to unite with General Cuesta's forces. The combined allied force prepared for an assault on Marshal Victor's I Corps at Talavera, 23 July. Cuesta, however, was reluctant to agree, and was only persuaded to advance on the following day. The delay allowed the French to withdraw, but Cuesta sent his army headlong after Victor, and found himself faced by almost the entire French army in New Castile—Victor had been reinforced by the Toledo and Madrid garrisons. The Spanish retreated precipitously, necessitating the advance of two British divisions to cover their retreat.

The next day, 27 July, at the Battle of Talavera the French advanced in three columns and were repulsed several times throughout the day by Wellesley, but at a heavy cost to the British force. In the aftermath Marshal Soult's army was discovered to be advancing south, threatening to cut Wellesley off from Portugal. Wellesley moved east on 3 August to block it, leaving 1,500 wounded in the care of the Spanish, intending to confront Soult before finding out that the French were in fact 30,000 strong. The British commander sent the Light Brigade on a dash to hold the bridge over the Tagus at Almaraz. With communications and supply from Lisbon secured for now, Wellesley considered joining with Cuesta again but found out that his Spanish ally had abandoned the British wounded to the French and was thoroughly uncooperative, promising and then refusing to supply the British forces, aggravating Wellesley and causing considerable friction between the British and their Spanish allies. The lack of supplies, coupled with the threat of French reinforcement (including the possible inclusion of Napoleon himself) in the spring, led to the British deciding to retreat into Portugal.

Following his victory at Talavera, Wellesley was elevated to the Peerage of the United Kingdom on 26 August 1809 as Viscount Wellington of Talavera and of Wellington, in the County of Somerset, with the subsidiary title of Baron Douro of Wellesley.

1810–1812 
In 1810, a newly enlarged French army under Marshal André Masséna invaded Portugal. British opinion was negative and there were suggestions to evacuate Portugal. Instead, Lord Wellington first slowed the French at Buçaco; he then prevented them from taking the Lisbon Peninsula by the construction of massive earthworks, known as the Lines of Torres Vedras, which had been assembled in complete secrecy with their flanks guarded by the Royal Navy. The baffled and starving French invasion forces retreated after six months. Wellington's pursuit was hindered by a series of reverses inflicted by Marshal Ney in a much-lauded rear guard campaign.

In 1811, Masséna returned toward Portugal to relieve Almeida; Wellington narrowly checked the French at the Battle of Fuentes de Oñoro. Simultaneously, his subordinate, Viscount Beresford, fought Soult's 'Army of the South' to a bloody stalemate at the Battle of Albuera in May. Wellington was promoted to full general on 31 July for his services. The French abandoned Almeida, avoiding British pursuit, but retained the twin Spanish fortresses of Ciudad Rodrigo and Badajoz, the 'Keys' guarding the roads through the mountain passes into Portugal.

In 1812, Wellington finally captured Ciudad Rodrigo via a rapid movement as the French went into winter quarters, storming it before they could react. He then moved south quickly, besieged the fortress of Badajoz for a month and captured it during the night on 6 April 1812. On viewing the aftermath of the Storming of Badajoz, Wellington lost his composure and cried at the sight of the British dead in the breaches.

His army now was a veteran British force reinforced by units of the retrained Portuguese army. Campaigning in Spain, he was made Earl of Wellington in the county of Somerset on 22 February 1812. He routed the French at the Battle of Salamanca, taking advantage of a minor French mispositioning. The victory liberated the Spanish capital of Madrid. He was later made Marquess of Wellington, in the said county on 18 August 1812.

Wellington attempted to take the vital fortress of Burgos, which linked Madrid to France. He failed, due in part to a lack of siege guns, forcing him into a headlong retreat with the loss of over 2,000 casualties.

The French abandoned Andalusia, and combined the troops of Soult and Marmont. Thus combined, the French outnumbered the British, putting the British forces in a precarious position. Wellington withdrew his army and, joined by the smaller corps under the command of Rowland Hill, which had been moved to Madrid, began to retreat to Portugal. Marshal Soult declined to attack.

1813–1814 
In 1813, Wellington led a new offensive, this time against the French line of communications. He struck through the hills north of Burgos, the Tras os Montes, and switched his supply line from Portugal to Santander on Spain's north coast; this led to the French abandoning Madrid and Burgos. Continuing to outflank the French lines, Wellington caught up with and routed the army of King Joseph Bonaparte in the Battle of Vitoria, for which he was promoted to field marshal on 21 June. He personally led a column against the French centre, while other columns commanded by Sir Thomas Graham, Rowland Hill and the Earl of Dalhousie looped around the French right and left (this battle became the subject of Beethoven's orchestral piece, the Wellington's Victory (Opus 91). The British troops broke ranks to loot the abandoned French wagons instead of pursuing the beaten foe. When troops failed to return to their units and began harassing the locals, an enraged Wellington to write in a famous despatch to Earl Bathurst, "We have in the service the scum of the earth as common soldiers".

Although later, when his temper had cooled, he extended his comment to praise the men under his command saying that though many of the men were, "the scum of the earth; it is really wonderful that we should have made them to the fine fellows they are".

After taking the small fortresses of Pamplona, Wellington invested San Sebastián but was frustrated by the obstinate French garrison, losing 693 dead and 316 captured in a failed assault and suspending the siege at the end of July. Soult's relief attempt was blocked by the Spanish Army of Galicia at San Marcial, allowing the Allies to consolidate their position and tighten the ring around the city, which fell in September after a second spirited defence. Wellington then forced Soult's demoralised and battered army into a fighting retreat into France, punctuated by battles at the Pyrenees, Bidassoa and Nivelle. Wellington invaded southern France, winning at the Nive and Orthez. Wellington's final battle against his rival Soult occurred at Toulouse, where the Allied divisions were badly mauled storming the French redoubts, losing some 4,600 men. Despite this momentary victory, news arrived of Napoleon's defeat and abdication and Soult, seeing no reason to continue the fighting, agreed on a ceasefire with Wellington, allowing Soult to evacuate the city.

Hailed as the conquering hero by the British, on 3 May 1814 Wellington was made Duke of Wellington, in the county of Somerset, together with the subsidiary title of Marquess Douro, in said County.

He received some recognition during his lifetime (the title of "Duque de Ciudad Rodrigo" and "Grandee of Spain") and the Spanish King Ferdinand VII allowed him to keep part of the works of art from the Royal Collection which he had recovered from the French. His equestrian portrait features prominently in the Monument to the Battle of Vitoria, in present-day Vitoria-Gasteiz.
 His popularity in Britain was due to his image and his appearance as well as to his military triumphs. His victory fitted well with the passion and intensity of the Romantic movement, with its emphasis on individuality. His personal style influenced the fashions in Britain at the time: his tall, lean figure and his plumed black hat and grand yet classic uniform and white trousers became very popular.

In late 1814, the Prime Minister wanted him to take command in Canada with the assignment of winning the War of 1812 against the United States. Wellesley replied that he would go to America, but he believed that he was needed more in Europe. He stated:

He was appointed Ambassador to France, then took Lord Castlereagh's place as first plenipotentiary to the Congress of Vienna.

On 2 January 1815, the title of his Knighthood of the Bath was converted to Knight Grand Cross upon the expansion of that order.

Hundred Days

Facing Napoleon

On 26 February 1815, Napoleon escaped from Elba and returned to France. He regained control of the country by May and faced a renewed alliance against him. Wellington left Vienna for what became known as the Waterloo Campaign. He arrived in the Netherlands to take command of the British-German army and their allied Dutch, all stationed alongside the Prussian forces of Generalfeldmarschall Gebhard Leberecht von Blücher.

Napoleon's strategy was to isolate the Allied and Prussian armies and annihilate each one separately before the Austrians and Russians arrived. In doing so the vast superiority in numbers of the Coalition would be greatly diminished. He would then seek the possibility of peace with Austria and Russia.

The French invaded the Netherlands, with Napoleon defeating the Prussians at Ligny, and Marshal Ney engaging indecisively with Wellington at the Battle of Quatre Bras. The Prussians retreated 18 miles north to Wavre whilst Wellington's Anglo-Allied army withdrew 15 miles north to a site he had noted the previous year as favourable for a battle: the north ridge of a shallow valley on the Brussels road, just south of the small town of Waterloo. On 17 June there was torrential rain, which severely hampered movement. and had a considerable effect the next day, 18 June, when the Battle of Waterloo was fought. This was the first time Wellington had encountered Napoleon; he commanded an Anglo-Dutch-German army that consisted of approximately 73,000 troops, 26,000 of whom were British. Approximately 30 percent of that 26,000 were Irish.

Battle of Waterloo

The Battle of Waterloo was fought on Sunday 18 June 1815, near Waterloo (at that time in the United Kingdom of the Netherlands, now in Belgium). It commenced with a diversionary attack on Hougoumont by a division of French soldiers. After a barrage of 80 cannons, the first French infantry attack was launched by Comte D'Erlon's I Corps. D'Erlon's troops advanced through the Allied centre, resulting in Allied troops in front of the ridge retreating in disorder through the main position. D'Erlon's corps stormed the most fortified Allied position, La Haye Sainte, but failed to take it. An Allied division under Thomas Picton met the remainder of D'Erlon's corps head to head, engaging them in an infantry duel in which Picton was killed. During this struggle Lord Uxbridge launched two of his cavalry brigades at the enemy, catching the French infantry off guard, driving them to the bottom of the slope, and capturing two French Imperial Eagles. The charge, however, over-reached itself, and the British cavalry, crushed by fresh French horsemen sent at them by Napoleon, were driven back, suffering tremendous losses.

Shortly before 16:00, Marshal Ney noted an apparent withdrawal from Wellington's centre. He mistook the movement of casualties to the rear for the beginnings of a retreat, and sought to exploit it. Ney at this time had few infantry reserves left, as most of the infantry had been committed either to the futile Hougoumont attack or to the defence of the French right. Ney, therefore, tried to break Wellington's centre with a cavalry charge alone.

At about 16:30, the first Prussian corps arrived. Commanded by Freiherr von Bülow, IV Corps arrived as the French cavalry attack was in full spate. Bülow sent the 15th Brigade to link up with Wellington's left flank in the Frichermont–La Haie area while the brigade's horse artillery battery and additional brigade artillery deployed to its left in support. Napoleon sent Lobau's corps to intercept the rest of Bülow's IV Corps proceeding to Plancenoit. The 15th Brigade sent Lobau's corps into retreat to the Plancenoit area. Von Hiller's 16th Brigade also pushed forward with six battalions against Plancenoit. Napoleon had dispatched all eight battalions of the Young Guard to reinforce Lobau, who was now seriously pressed by the enemy. Napoleon's Young Guard counter-attacked and, after very hard fighting, secured Plancenoit, but were themselves counter-attacked and driven out. Napoleon then resorted to sending two battalions of the Middle and Old Guard into Plancenoit and after ferocious fighting they recaptured the village.
The French cavalry attacked the British infantry squares many times, each at a heavy cost to the French but with few British casualties. Ney himself was displaced from his horse four times. Eventually, it became obvious, even to Ney, that cavalry alone were achieving little. Belatedly, he organised a combined-arms attack, using Bachelu's division and Tissot's regiment of Foy's division from Reille's II Corps plus those French cavalry that remained in a fit state to fight. This assault was directed along much the same route as the previous heavy cavalry attacks.

Meanwhile, at approximately the same time as Ney's combined-arms assault on the centre-right of Wellington's line, Napoleon ordered Ney to capture La Haye Sainte at whatever the cost. Ney accomplished this with what was left of D'Erlon's corps soon after 18:00. Ney then moved horse artillery up towards Wellington's centre and began to attack the infantry squares at short-range with canister. This all but destroyed the 27th (Inniskilling) Regiment, and the 30th and 73rd Regiments suffered such heavy losses that they had to combine to form a viable square. Wellington's centre was now on the verge of collapse and wide open to an attack from the French. Luckily for Wellington, Pirch I's and Zieten's corps of the Prussian Army were now at hand. Zieten's corps permitted the two fresh cavalry brigades of Vivian and Vandeleur on Wellington's extreme left to be moved and posted behind the depleted centre. Pirch I Corps then proceeded to support Bülow and together they regained possession of Plancenoit, and once more the Charleroi road was swept by Prussian round shot. The value of this reinforcement is held in high regard.

The French army now fiercely attacked the Coalition all along the line with the culminating point being reached when Napoleon sent forward the Imperial Guard at 19:30. The attack of the Imperial Guards was mounted by five battalions of the Middle Guard, and not by the Grenadiers or Chasseurs of the Old Guard. Marching through a hail of canister and skirmisher fire and severely outnumbered, the 3,000 or so Middle Guardsmen advanced to the west of La Haye Sainte and proceeded to separate into three distinct attack forces. One, consisting of two battalions of Grenadiers, defeated the Coalition's first line and marched on. Chassé's relatively fresh Dutch division was sent against them, and Allied artillery fired into the victorious Grenadiers' flank. This still could not stop the Guard's advance, so Chassé ordered his first brigade to charge the outnumbered French, who faltered and broke.

Further to the west, 1,500 British Foot Guards under Maitland were lying down to protect themselves from the French artillery. As two battalions of Chasseurs approached, the second prong of the Imperial Guard's attack, Maitland's guardsmen rose and devastated them with point-blank volleys. The Chasseurs deployed to counter-attack but began to waver. A bayonet charge by the Foot Guards then broke them. The third prong, a fresh Chasseur battalion, now came up in support. The British guardsmen retreated with these Chasseurs in pursuit, but the latter were halted as the 52nd Light Infantry wheeled in line onto their flank and poured a devastating fire into them and then charged. Under this onslaught, they too broke.

The last of the Guard retreated headlong. Mass panic ensued through the French lines as the news spread: "La Garde recule. Sauve qui peut!" ("The Guard is retreating. Every man for himself!"). Wellington then stood up in Copenhagen's stirrups, and waved his hat in the air to signal an advance of the Allied line just as the Prussians were overrunning the French positions to the east. What remained of the French army then abandoned the field in disorder. Wellington and Blücher met at the inn of La Belle Alliance, on the north–south road which bisected the battlefield, and it was agreed that the Prussians should pursue the retreating French army back to France. The Treaty of Paris was signed on 20 November 1815.

After the victory, the Duke supported proposals that a medal be awarded to all British soldiers who participated in the Waterloo campaign, and on 28 June 1815, he wrote to the Duke of York suggesting: ... the expediency of giving to the non-commissioned officers and soldiers engaged in the Battle of Waterloo a medal. I am convinced it would have the best effect in the army, and if the battle should settle our concerns, they will well deserve it.The Waterloo Medal was duly authorised and distributed to all ranks in 1816.

Controversy 
Much historical discussion has been made about Napoleon's decision to send 33,000 troops under Marshal Grouchy to intercept the Prussians, but—having defeated Blücher at Ligny on 16 June and forced the Allies to retreat in divergent directions—Napoleon may have been strategically astute in a judgement that he would have been unable to beat the combined Allied forces on one battlefield.

The campaign led to numerous other controversies. Issues concerning Wellington's troop dispositions prior to Napoleon's invasion of the Netherlands, whether Wellington misled or betrayed Blücher by promising, then failing, to come directly to Blücher's aid at Ligny, and credit for the victory between Wellington and the Prussians. These and other such issues concerning Blücher's, Wellington's, and Napoleon's decisions during the campaign were the subject of a strategic-level study by the Prussian political-military theorist Carl von Clausewitz,  Feldzug von 1815: Strategische Uebersicht des Feldzugs von 1815, (English title: The Campaign of 1815: Strategic Overview of the Campaign.) This study was Clausewitz's last such work and is widely considered to be the best example of Clausewitz's mature theories concerning such analyses. It attracted the attention of Wellington's staff, who prompted the Duke to write a published essay on the campaign (other than his immediate, official after-action report, "The Waterloo Dispatch".) This was published as the 1842 "Memorandum on the Battle of Waterloo". While Wellington disputed Clausewitz on several points, Clausewitz largely absolved Wellington of accusations levelled against him. This exchange with Clausewitz was quite famous in Britain in the 19th century, particularly in Charles Cornwallis Chesney's work the Waterloo Lectures, but was largely ignored in the 20th century due to hostilities between Britain and Germany.

Politics

Prime Minister

Wellington entered politics again when he was appointed Master-General of the Ordnance in the Tory government of Lord Liverpool on 26 December 1818. He also became Governor of Plymouth on 9 October 1819. He was appointed Commander-in-Chief of the British Army on 22 January 1827 and Constable of the Tower of London on 5 February 1827.

Along with Robert Peel, Wellington became an increasingly influential member of the Tory party, and in 1828 he resigned as Commander-in-Chief and became prime minister.

During his first seven months as prime minister, he chose not to live in the official residence at 10 Downing Street, finding it too small. He moved in only because his own home, Apsley House, required extensive renovations. During this time he was largely instrumental in the foundation of King's College London. On 20 January 1829 Wellington was appointed Lord Warden of the Cinque Ports.

Reform

His term was marked by Roman Catholic Emancipation: the restoration of most civil rights to Roman Catholics in the United Kingdom of Great Britain and Ireland. The change was prompted by the landslide by-election win of Daniel O'Connell, a Roman Catholic Irish proponent of emancipation, who was elected despite not being legally allowed to sit in Parliament. In the House of Lords, facing stiff opposition, Wellington spoke for Catholic Emancipation, and according to some sources, gave one of the best speeches of his career. Wellington was born in Ireland and so had some understanding of the grievances of the Roman Catholic majority there; as Chief Secretary, he had given an undertaking that the remaining Penal Laws would only be enforced as "mildly" as possible. In 1811 Catholic soldiers were given freedom of worship and 18 years later the Catholic Relief Act 1829 was passed with a majority of 105. Many Tories voted against the Act, and it passed only with the help of the Whigs. Wellington had threatened to resign as prime minister if King George IV did not give Royal Assent.

The Earl of Winchilsea accused the Duke of "an insidious design for the infringement of our liberties and the introduction of Popery into every department of the State". Wellington responded by immediately challenging Winchilsea to a duel. On 21 March 1829, Wellington and Winchilsea met on Battersea fields. When the time came to fire, the Duke took aim and Winchilsea kept his arm down. The Duke fired wide to the right. Accounts differ as to whether he missed on purpose, an act known in duelling as a delope. Wellington claimed he did. However, he was noted for his poor aim and reports more sympathetic to Winchilsea claimed he had aimed to kill. Winchilsea discharged his pistol into the air, a plan he and his second had almost certainly decided upon before the duel.Honour was saved and Winchilsea wrote Wellington an apology.

The nickname "Iron Duke" originated from this period, when he experienced a high degree of personal and political unpopularity. Its repeated use in Freeman's Journal throughout June 1830 appears to bear reference to his resolute political will, with taints of disapproval from its Irish editors. During this time, Wellington was greeted by a hostile reaction from the crowds at the opening of the Liverpool and Manchester Railway.

Wellington's government fell in 1830. In the summer and autumn of that year, a wave of riots swept the country. The Whigs had been out of power for most years since the 1770s, and saw political reform in response to the unrest as the key to their return. Wellington stuck to the Tory policy of no reform and no expansion of suffrage, and as a result, lost a vote of no confidence on 15 November 1830.

The Whigs introduced the first Reform Bill while Wellington and the Tories worked to prevent its passage. The Whigs could not get the bill past its second reading in the British House of Commons, and the attempt failed. An election followed in direct response and the Whigs were returned with a landslide majority. A second Reform Act was introduced and passed in the House of Commons but was defeated in the Tory-controlled House of Lords. Another wave of near-insurrection swept the country. Wellington's residence at Apsley House was targeted by a mob of demonstrators on 27 April 1831 and again on 12 October, leaving his windows smashed. Iron shutters were installed in June 1832 to prevent further damage by crowds angry over rejection of the Reform Bill, which he strongly opposed.  The Whig Government fell in 1832 and Wellington was unable to form a Tory Government partly because of a run on the Bank of England. This left King William IV no choice but to restore Earl Grey to the premiership. Eventually, the bill passed the House of Lords after the King threatened to fill that House with newly created Whig peers if it were not. Wellington was never reconciled to the change; when Parliament first met after the first election under the widened franchise, Wellington is reported to have said "I never saw so many shocking bad hats in my life".

Wellington opposed the Jewish Civil Disabilities Repeal Bill, and he stated in Parliament on 1 August 1833 that England "is a Christian country and a Christian legislature, and that the effect of this measure would be to remove that peculiar character." The Bill was defeated by 104 votes to 54.

Government

Wellington was gradually superseded as leader of the Tories by Robert Peel, while the party evolved into the Conservatives. When the Tories were returned to power in 1834, Wellington declined to become prime minister because he thought membership in the House of Commons had become essential. The king reluctantly approved Peel, who was in Italy. Hence, Wellington acted as interim leader for three weeks in November and December 1834, taking the responsibilities of prime minister and most of the other ministries. In Peel's first cabinet (1834–1835), Wellington became foreign secretary, while in the second (1841–1846) he was a minister without portfolio and Leader of the House of Lords. Wellington was also re-appointed Commander-in-Chief of the British Army on 15 August 1842 following the resignation of Lord Hill.

Wellington served as the leader of the Conservative party in the House of Lords from 1828 to 1846. Some historians have belittled him as a befuddled reactionary, but a consensus in the late 20th century depicts him as a shrewd operator who hid his cleverness behind the façade of a poorly informed old soldier. Wellington worked to transform the Lords from unstinting support of the Crown to an active player in political manoeuvering, with a commitment to the landed aristocracy. He used his London residence as a venue for intimate dinners and private consultations, together with extensive correspondence that kept him in close touch with party leaders in the Commons, and the main persona in the Lords. He gave public rhetorical support to Ultra-Tory anti-reform positions, but then deftly changed positions toward the party's centre, especially when Peel needed support from the upper house. Wellington's success was based on the 44 elected peers from Scotland and Ireland, whose elections he controlled.

Later life

Family 

Wellesley was married by his brother Gerald, a clergyman, to Kitty Pakenham in St George's Church, Dublin on 10 April 1806. They had two children: Arthur was born in 1807 and Charles was born in 1808. The marriage proved unsatisfactory and the two spent years apart, while Wellesley was campaigning and afterwards. Kitty grew depressed, and Wellesley pursued other sexual and romantic partners. The couple largely lived apart, with Kitty spending most of her time at their country home, Stratfield Saye House and Wellesley at their London home, Apsley House. Kitty's brother Edward Pakenham served under Wellesley throughout the Peninsular War, and Wellesley's regard for him helped to smooth his relations with Kitty, until Pakenham's death at the Battle of New Orleans in 1815.

Retirement
Wellington retired from political life in 1846, although he remained Commander-in-Chief, and returned briefly to the public eye in 1848 when he helped organise a military force to protect London during the year of European revolution. The Conservative Party had split over the repeal of the Corn Laws in 1846, with Wellington and most of the former Cabinet still supporting Peel, but most of the MPs led by Lord Derby supporting a protectionist stance. Early in 1852 Wellington, by then very deaf, gave Derby's first government its nickname by shouting "Who? Who?" as the list of inexperienced Cabinet ministers was read out in the House of Lords. He became Chief Ranger and Keeper of Hyde Park and St James's Park on 31 August 1850. He remained colonel of the 33rd Regiment of Foot from 1 February 1806 and colonel of the Grenadier Guards from 22 January 1827. Kitty died of cancer in 1831; despite their generally unhappy relations, which had led to an effective separation, Wellington was said to have been greatly saddened by her death, his one comfort being that after "half a lifetime together, they had come to understand each other at the end". He had found consolation for his unhappy marriage in his warm friendship with the diarist Harriet Arbuthnot, wife of his colleague Charles Arbuthnot. Harriet's death in the cholera epidemic of 1834 was almost as great a blow to Wellington as it was to her husband. The two widowers spent their last years together at Apsley House.

Death and funeral

Wellington died at Walmer Castle in Kent, his residence as Lord Warden of the Cinque Ports and reputedly his favourite home, on 14 September 1852. He was found to be unwell on that morning and was helped from his campaign bed, which he had used throughout his military career, and seated in his chair where he died. His death was recorded as being due to the after-effects of a stroke culminating in a series of seizures. He was aged 83.

Although in life he hated travelling by rail, having witnessed the death of William Huskisson, one of the first railway accident casualties, his body was taken by train to London, where he was given a state funeral – one of a small number of British subjects to be so honoured (other examples include Lord Nelson and Sir Winston Churchill). The funeral took place on 18 November 1852. Before the funeral, the Duke's body lay in state at the Royal Hospital Chelsea. Members of the royal family, including Queen Victoria, the Prince Consort, the Prince of Wales, and the Princess Royal, visited to pay their respects. When viewing opened to the public, crowds thronged to visit and several people were killed in the crush.

He was buried in St Paul's Cathedral, and during his funeral, there was little space to stand due to the number of attendees. A bronze memorial was sculpted by Alfred Stevens, and features two intricate supports: "Truth tearing the tongue out of the mouth of False-hood", and "Valour trampling Cowardice underfoot". Stevens did not live to see it placed in its home under one of the arches of the cathedral.

Wellington's casket was decorated with banners which were made for his funeral procession. Originally, there was one from Prussia, which was removed during World War I and never reinstated. In the procession, the "Great Banner" was carried by General Sir James Charles Chatterton of the 4th Dragoon Guards on the orders of Queen Victoria.

Most of the book A Biographical Sketch of the Military and Political Career of the Late Duke of Wellington by Weymouth newspaper proprietor Joseph Drew is a detailed contemporary account of his death, lying in state and funeral.

After his death, Irish and English newspapers disputed whether Wellington had been born an Irishman or an Englishman. In 2002, he was number 15 in the BBC's poll of the 100 Greatest Britons.

Owing to its links with Wellington, as the former commanding officer and colonel of the regiment, the title "33rd (The Duke of Wellington's) Regiment" was granted to the 33rd Regiment of Foot, on 18 June 1853 (the 38th anniversary of the Battle of Waterloo) by Queen Victoria. Wellington's battle record is exemplary; he participated in some 60 battles during the course of his military career.

Personality

Wellington always rose early; he "couldn't bear to lie awake in bed", even if the army was not on the march. Even when he returned to civilian life after 1815, he slept in a camp bed, reflecting his lack of regard for creature comforts. General Miguel de Álava complained that Wellington said so often that the army would march "at daybreak" and dine on "cold meat" that he began to dread those two phrases. While on campaign, he seldom ate anything between breakfast and dinner. During the retreat to Portugal in 1811, he subsisted on "cold meat and bread", to the despair of his staff who dined with him. He was, however, renowned for the quality of the wine that he drank and served, often drinking a bottle with his dinner (not a great quantity by the standards of his day).

Álava was a witness to an incident just before the Battle of Salamanca. Wellington was eating a chicken leg while observing the manoeuvres of the French army through a spyglass. He spotted an overextension in the French left flank, and realised that he could launch a successful attack there. He exclaimed "By God, that will do!" and threw the drumstick in the air. After the Battle of Toulouse, Colonel Frederick Ponsonby brought him the news of Napoleon's abdication, and Wellington broke into an impromptu flamenco dance, spinning around on his heels and clicking his fingers.

Military historian Charles Dalton recorded that, after a hard-fought battle in Spain, a young officer made the comment, "I am going to dine with Wellington tonight", which was overheard by the Duke as he rode by. "Give me at least the prefix of Mr. before my name," Wellington said. "My Lord," replied the officer, "we do not speak of Mr. Caesar or Mr. Alexander, so why should I speak of Mr. Wellington?"

While known for his stern countenance and iron-handed discipline, Wellington was by no means unfeeling. While he is said to have disapproved of soldiers cheering as "too nearly an expression of opinion". Wellington nevertheless cared for his men: he refused to pursue the French after the battles of Porto and Salamanca, foreseeing an inevitable cost to his army in chasing a diminished enemy through rough terrain. The only time that he ever showed grief in public was after the storming of Badajoz: he cried at the sight of the British dead in the breaches.In this context, his famous despatch after the Battle of Vitoria, calling them the "scum of the earth" can be seen to be fuelled as much by disappointment at their breaking ranks as by anger. He shed tears after Waterloo on the presentation of the list of British fallen by Dr John Hume. Later with his family, unwilling to be congratulated for his victory, he broke down in tears, his fighting spirit diminished by the high cost of the battle and great personal loss.

Wellington's soldier servant, a gruff German called Beckerman, and his long-serving valet, James Kendall, who served him for 25 years and was with him when he died, were both devoted to him. (A story that he never spoke to his servants and preferred instead to write his orders on a notepad on his dressing table in fact probably refers to his son, the 2nd Duke. It was recorded by the 3rd Duke's niece, Viva Seton Montgomerie (1879–1959), as being an anecdote she heard from an old retainer, Charles Holman, who was said greatly to resemble Napoleon.)

Following an incident when, as Master-General of the Ordnance he had been close to a large explosion, Wellington began to experience deafness and other ear-related problems. In 1822, he had an operation to improve the hearing of the left ear. The result, however, was that he became permanently deaf on that side. It is claimed that he was "never quite well afterwards".

Wellington came to enjoy the company of a variety of intellectual and attractive women and had many amorous liaisons, particularly after the Battle of Waterloo and his subsequent ambassadorial position in Paris. In the days following Waterloo he had an affair with the notorious Lady Caroline Lamb, sister of one of his severely wounded officers and favourites, Col Frederick Ponsonby. He corresponded for many years with Lady Georgiana Lennox, later Lady de Ros, 26 years his junior and daughter of the Duchess of Richmond (who held the famous ball on the eve of Waterloo) and, though there are hints, it has not been clearly determined if the relationship was ever sexual. The British press lampooned the amorous side of the national hero. In 1824, one liaison came back to haunt him, when Wellington received a letter from a publisher, John Joseph Stockdale offering to refrain from issuing an edition of the rather racy memoirs of one of his mistresses Harriette Wilson, in exchange for money. It is said that the Duke promptly returned the letter, after scrawling across it, "Publish and be damned". However, Hibbert notes in his biography that the letter can be found among the Duke's papers, with nothing written on it. It is certain that Wellington  reply, and the tone of a further letter from the publisher, quoted by Longford, suggests that he had refused in the strongest language to submit to blackmail.

He was also a remarkably practical man who spoke concisely. In 1851, it was discovered that there were a great many sparrows flying about in the Crystal Palace just before the Great Exhibition was to open. His advice to Queen Victoria was "Sparrowhawks, ma'am".

Wellington has often been portrayed as a defensive general, even though many, perhaps most, of his battles were offensive (Argaum, Assaye, Oporto, Salamanca, Vitoria, Toulouse). However, for most of the Peninsular War, where he earned his fame, his army lacked the numbers for a strategically offensive posture.

Titles and tributes

Nicknames

The Iron Duke

This commonly used nickname originally related to his consistent political resolve rather than to any particular incident. In various cases its editorial use appears to be disparaging.

It is likely that its use became more widespread after an incident in 1832 in which he installed metal shutters to prevent rioters breaking windows at Apsley House. The term may have been made increasingly popular by Punch cartoons published in 1844–45.

Other nicknames
 In the popular ballads of the day Wellington was called "Nosey" or "Old Nosey".
 Tsar Alexander I of Russia called Wellington "Le vainqueur du vainqueur du monde", the conqueror of the world's conqueror, the phrase "the world's conqueror" referring to Napoleon. Lord Tennyson uses a similar reference in his "Ode on the Death of the Duke of Wellington", referring to him as "the great World-victor's victor".
 Officers under his command called him "The Beau", as he was a fine dresser.
 Spanish troops called him "The Eagle", while Portuguese troops called him "Douro Douro" after his river crossing at Oporto in 1809.
 "Beau Douro"; Wellington found this amusing when hearing it used by a Colonel of the Coldstream Guards.
 "Sepoy General"; Napoleon used this term as an insult to Wellington's military service in India, publicly considering him an unworthy opponent. The name was used in the French newspaper Le Moniteur Universel, as a means of propaganda.
 "The Beef"; It is a theory that the Beef Wellington dish is a reference to Wellington, although some chefs dispute this.
"Europe's Liberator"
"Saviour of the Nations"

See also

 Military career of Arthur Wellesley, 1st Duke of Wellington
 Army Gold Medal
 Military General Service Medal
 Seringapatam medal
 Cotiote War

References

Notes

Citations

Sources
Books

 
 
 
  
 
 
 
 
 
 
 
 
 
 

 
 
 
 
 
 
 
 
 
 
 
 
 
 
 
 
 
 
 
 
  
 
  
 
 
 
 
 
 
 
 
 
 
 .
 

Online resources

 
 
 
 
 
 
 
 .
 
 
 
 
 
 
 
 
 
 
 
 
 
 

Journals and magazines

 
 
 
 
 
  
 
 
 
 
 

Primary sources

Further reading

 
  
  This on-line text contains Clausewitz's 58-chapter study of the Campaign of 1815 and Wellington's lengthy 1842 essay written in response to Clausewitz, as well as supporting documents and essays by the editors.
 
 
 
 Goldsmith, Thomas. "The Duke of Wellington and British Foreign Policy 1814-1830." (PhD Diss. University of East Anglia, 2016). online
 
 
 
 Lambert, A. "Politics, administration and decision-making: Wellington and the navy, 1828–30" Wellington Studies IV, ed. C. M. Woolgar, (Southampton, 2008), pp. 185–243.
 Longford, Elizabeth. Wellington: Pillar of State (1972), vol 2 of her biography; online

External links

Records and images from the UK Parliament Collections
 The life of Arthur Wellesley, Duke of Wellington
 Duke of Wellington's Regiment – West Riding
 Papers of Arthur Wellesley, first Duke of Wellington (MS 61) at the University of Southampton
 
 
 
 More about Arthur Wellesley, Duke of Wellington on the Downing Street website
 
 
 
 "Napoleon and Wellington", BBC Radio 4 discussion with Andrew Roberts, Mike Broer and Belinda Beaton (In Our Time, 25 October 2001)

 
1769 births
1852 deaths
19th-century Anglo-Irish people
19th-century prime ministers of the United Kingdom
Wellesley Arthur
Wellesley, Arthur
Ambassadors of the United Kingdom to France
British Army commanders of the Napoleonic Wars
British Army personnel of the French Revolutionary Wars
British Army personnel of the Peninsular War
British Secretaries of State for Foreign Affairs
British Secretaries of State
British field marshals
British military personnel of the Fourth Anglo-Mysore War
British military personnel of the Second Anglo-Maratha War
Burials at St Paul's Cathedral
Chancellors of the University of Oxford
Chief Secretaries for Ireland
Commissioners of the Treasury for Ireland
Constables of the Tower of London
Cotiote War
Diplomatic peers
British duellists
Duke of Wellington's Regiment officers
Dukes da Vitória
Dukes of Ciudad Rodrigo
101
Wellesley, Arthur 1
Fellows of the Royal Society
Field marshals of Portugal
Field marshals of Russia
Grandees of Spain
Grenadier Guards officers
Irish Anglicans
Wellesley, Arthur
Irish expatriates in England
Irish expatriates in France
Irish expatriates in India
Irish expatriates in Portugal
Irish expatriates in Spain
Irish expatriates in the Netherlands
Irish officers in the British Army
Leaders of the Conservative Party (UK)
Lord High Constables of England
Lord-Lieutenants of Hampshire
Lord-Lieutenants of the Tower Hamlets
Lords Warden of the Cinque Ports
MPs for rotten boroughs
Members of Trinity House
Wellesley, Arthur
Wellesley, Arthur
Wellesley, Arthur
Members of the Privy Council of Ireland
Members of the Privy Council of the United Kingdom
Peers of the United Kingdom created by George III
People associated with King's College London
People educated at Eton College
Wellesley, Arthur
Prime Ministers of the United Kingdom
Princes of Waterloo
Regency era
Royal Horse Guards officers
Spanish captain generals
Tory prime ministers of the United Kingdom
Wellesley, Arthur
Wellesley, Arthur
UK MPs who were granted peerages
Arthur Wellesley, 1st Duke of Wellington
Younger sons of earls

Knights of the Garter
Knights Grand Cross of the Order of the Bath
Recipients of the Army Gold Cross
Recipients of the Waterloo Medal
Grand Crosses of the Military Order of Maria Theresa
Grand Crosses of the Military Order of Max Joseph
Knights Grand Cross of the Military Order of William
Recipients of the Order of St. Anna, 1st class
Recipients of the Order of St. George of the First Degree
Knights of the Golden Fleece of Spain
Grand Crosses of the Royal and Military Order of San Hermenegild
Laureate Cross of Saint Ferdinand
Knights Grand Cross of the Order of the Sword
Leaders of the House of Lords
W